Metodi Andonov (16 March 1932 – 12 April 1974) was a Bulgarian film director.

Selected filmography
 Byalata staya (1968)
  (1971)
 The Goat Horn (1972)
  (1973)

References

External links
 

1932 births
1974 deaths
People from Pernik Province
Bulgarian filmmakers
Bulgarian film directors
National Academy for Theatre and Film Arts alumni